Corinth is an unincorporated community in Chatham County, North Carolina, United States. The community is located in the panhandle of Chatham County, southeast of Moncure. It was named in homage to the ancient Greek city of Corinth.

Notes

Unincorporated communities in North Carolina
Unincorporated communities in Chatham County, North Carolina